This is a list of Beetleborgs monsters featured in both versions of the American children's television series.

Big Bad Beetleborgs
Here is a list of monsters brought out of the comics by the Magnavores. The monsters here are adapted from Juukou B-Fighter:

Amphibious Monster
 First Appearance: "Beetle Rock, Part 1" (9/7/96)
 Voice Actor: Lex Lang

An armored amphibious monster shown in Drew's Beetleborgs comic and day-dream. This monster later appeared again when Vexor released numerous monster from the comics during the "Curse of the Shadow Borg" saga, yet was not seen again after being summoned. Drew names this creature "Hairball", though it may have just been an insult.

Terror Bear
 First Appearance: "The Ghost is Toast" (9/10/96)
 Voice Actor: Mike Reynolds

A people-eating black bear monster....or at least he was supposed to be in the comics. Terror Bear had a huge sweet tooth and preferred junk food over human flesh as seen when Terror Bear ate the sweet stuff that was placed on the ice cream man that he was supposed to eat. He was the first monster to be pulled out of the comics, had iron mace balls shackled to each wrist, and a third eye on his chest. In battle, he launched spikes that protruded from his body like explosive missiles. He was defeated and sent back to the comics by the Beetleborgs and their Sonic Laser Sabers.

Green Cannon Machine
 First Appearance: "The Treasure of Hillhurst Mansion" (9/11/96)
 Voice Actor: Tom Wyner (1st time), Ezra Weisz (2nd time)

A green android monster that had cannons in his fists and shoulder-mounted missile launchers. Drew mentions that he is from issue #99 of the Beetleborgs comics. The Magnavores were seeking Hillhurst's treasure. To aid them, they summoned the Green Cannon Machine to obstruct the Beetleborgs. The Beetleborgs did him in with their weapons.

This monster was re-released by Vexor during the "Curse of the Shadow Borg" saga, where he was one of the first victims of Drew's Thunder Stinger (before upgrading to Mega-Blue).

Sword Warrior
 First Appearance: "Say the Magic Word" (9/13/96)
 Voice Actor: Peter Greenwood

A samurai monster summoned by the Magnavores. He was first released when Jo was invisible and later defeated by a restored Jo and her Striker Blaster. He was then released during the comic book convention alongside Cataclazmic, Wingar and Goldex, and was also released during the "Curse of the Shadow Borg" saga. He was one of the first victims of Drew's Thunder Stinger (before upgrading to Mega-Blue).

Galaclops
 Mentioned in Episode:"Lights, Camera, Too Much Action" (9/14/96)

Unseen monster from the comics suggested by Typhus as the monster to send to the Hollywood filmmakers set. According to Typhus, this monster is from issue #8.

Graxxis
 First Appearance: "Lights, Camera, Too Much Action" (9/14/96)
 Voice Actor: Tom Wyner

A mantis-like monster. Roland mentioned that he was from issue #102 from the Beetleborgs comic series. In battle, Graxxis could release green lasers (when angry) and launch a sharp stinger-tipped rope from its mouth. While Hollywood filmmakers were making a horror flick in Charterville, Vexor ordered Jara, Noxic, and Typhus to summon a monster to cause havoc on their behalf. Graxxis was summoned at the suggestion of Noxic. Graxxis was mistaken for the leading monster of the horror flick. After he grew tired of the director's abuse, he went out to cause real trouble in the city. His rampage was ultimately stopped by Drew's Stinger Drill. He was released again during the "Curse of the Shadow Borg" saga by Vexor where he was one of the first victims of Drew's Thunder Stinger (before upgrading to Mega-Blue). He was released again by Nukus during the finale of Season 1.

LottaMuggs
 First Appearance: "Nano in the House" (9/16/96)
 Voice Actor: Ezra Weisz

A multi-faced amoeba-like monster. Roland mentions that he was from issue #17 of the Beetleborgs comic books. The Magnavores stole the Amulet of Subjugation, which hypnotizes people into becoming the wearer's servants. LottaMuggs was determined to get his amulet back at any cost. LottaMuggs could summon blasts from his hands as well as turn into flying worm-like energy projectiles. He was eventually defeated by the Sonic Lasers. He was released from the comics again by Vexor in the "Curse of the Shadow Borg" saga where he was one of the victims of Drew's Thunder Stinger (before upgrading to Mega-Blue). He was released again by Nukus during the finale of season 1.

Garganturat
 First Appearance: "Locomotion Commotion" (9/17/96)
 Voice Actors: Will Long

A hunchbacked rat monster. Drew mentions that he was from issue #113 of the Beetleborgs comic series. Roland also mentioned that Garganturat was born from eating radioactive contaminated cheese mutating him into his monster form in the comic books. The Magnavores wanted to steal a train, but needed a diversion. They summoned Garganturat to be the diversion. Garganturat kidnapped Heather to keep the Beetleborgs busy. He then shrunk himself and hid in a mousehole dimension where he was finished off by the Beetleborgs' power weapons. He came back twice, once by Vexor's powers in the "Curse of the Shadow Borg." saga where he was one of the victims of Drew's Thunder Stinger (before upgrading to Mega-Blue). He was released again by Nukus during the Season 1 finale.

Firecat
 First Appearance: "Cat-Tastrophy" (9/18/96)
 Voice Actor: Tom Charles

Firecat was a weak cat creature that required recharging through a special machine. When fully charged, he was stronger and had the ability to breathe fire. Noxic proudly took credit for creating Firecat, claiming he was the one who took a "weak and helpless pussy cat" and changed it into Firecat through the special machine. Typhus, seemingly based on the monster's theme, argued that the creature was from his army of monsters. He scratched Drew in battle, causing Drew to turn into a cat-like creature himself. Firecat, on the other hand, could not be controlled. Noxic and Typhus lured it with candy so they could place him back into the machine to restore him. Drew's condition worsened, and his only chance to get back to normal was by getting into the machine himself. The machine overloaded, but Drew came out in full Beetleborg form. Firecat came out too, but was angry and blackened, seemingly from being burnt to a crisp in the machine. Aside from being blackened, Firecat was still not under control and released fireballs everywhere. Firecat was defeated in the end by Drew's Stinger Drill.

Queen Magna
 First Appearance: "Drew and Flabber's Less-Than-Fabulous Adventure" (9/19/96)
 Actor: Lisa Walsh

A white and blue butterfly-themed sorceress with a hypnotic voice who wore a blue jeweled necklace. Heather's birthday had arrived and Drew wanted to give her as a present. Jo mentioned that Queen Magna was from Issue #113 which had her on the cover and Heather was fixated by the necklace that the villainess wore around her neck. Drew decided to give Heather that necklace for her birthday, so he convinced Flabber to take them into Magna's comic book world. However, Drew's Beetleborg powers would not work inside the comic book, so he and Flabber were at a disadvantage when confronted by Magna. As Magna tried to put them under her spell with her hypnotic vocalizing, Flabber broke free, and both he and Drew escaped leaving the necklace behind. Magna, in her dimension, sat on a throne and was fawned over by various Scabs, some of which were seen fanning her off, brushing her wings, and serving her nectar to drink. The Magnavores tried to trap Drew and Flabber in the comic book/comic book's dimension while they were inside.

Dominailer
 Mentioned in Episode: "Ghouls Just Wanna Have Fun" (9/20/96)

Unseen monster from the comics mentioned by the Beetleborgs as a possible secret weapon for the Magnavores. Roland says he is from issue #18. Drew mentions that he can shoot poisonous nails from his eyes.

Photominator
 First Appearance: "The Littlest Brattleborg" (9/27/96)
 Voice Actor: Gregg Bullock

Photominator is a camera monster with deadly lenses. When Drew and Jo's cousin Oliver, dressed as the Blue Stinger Borg, came for a visit, the Magnavores mistook him for the real one. Oliver constantly took their pictures, giving Vexor inspiration to summon the Magnavore's old friend the Photominator. Photominator was easily beaten by the Beetleborgs (including the REAL Blue Stinger). He appeared again during the "Curse of the Shadow Borg" saga thanks to Vexor's magic.

Mace Warrior
 First Appearance: "Haunted Hideout" (9/28/96)
 Voice Actor: Peter Greenwood

An axe-bladed mace-wielding warrior with a cattle skull-shaped helmet and a red tunic summoned by Jara. Roland mentioned that he came from issue #18 of the Beetleborgs comics. He wielded and could toss his mace at far distances causing explosions, one of which set the nearby forest on fire. His mission was to stir-up some trouble, which he attempted to do by destroying a forest (and its wildlife) near Hillhurst. In battle, he could also blast lasers from the top of his mace. He deflected the Beetleborgs laser blasts back at them with his shield. Roland sent him back to the comics using his Hunter Claw.

Amphead
 First Appearance: "Monster Rock" (10/4/96)
 Voice Actor: Bob Papenbrook

An over-sized amplifier robot that played loud, devastating music. The Magnavores got word that a famous rock band was in town and were inspired to create music mayhem of their own. He was defeated but came back twice, once by Vexor in the "Curse of the Shadow Borg" saga and again by Nukus during the Season 1 finale.

Cataclazmic
 First Appearance: "Convention Dimension" (10/5/96)
 Voice Actor: Damian Pappahranis

Cataclazmic is a yellow caterpillar monster who was said to be from issue #141 of the comic book series. He first appeared as part of the comic book army used to terrorize the comic convention. In "She Wolf," Cataclazmic was brought back once more to help Noxic and Typhus retrieve Jara (who had been turned into a werewolf by Wolfgang). He was sent back to the comics by Drew's Stinger Drill.

Wingar
 First Appearance: "Convention Dimension" (10/5/96)
 Voice Actor: Richard Epcar

A bird-like monster pulled from a comic book at the convention. It was defeated with the aid of Karato and Silver Ray and by the combined effort of the Beetleborgs weapons. Despite being from a different comic, Wingar's face was later seen on Borgslayer.

Goldex
 First Appearance: "Convention Dimension" (10/5/96)

Karato's arch enemy. He was designed like Karato only with a red and gold armor plate. He was defeated with the combined power of the Beetleborgs weapons. Despite being from a different comic, Goldex's face was later seen on Borgslayer.

Venus Claptrap
 First Appearance: "Root of All Evil" (10/11/96)
 Voice Actor: Bob Johnson

A large man-eating plant monster that could fire burning pollen. In the comics, Vexor was once surrounded by his kind. He was brought from the comics to steal Drew's unusual plant. During battle, Claptrap swallowed Roland and Jo inside and they clung onto his inner roots to avoid falling into his stomach acid. He ended up defeated in the end, when Drew used the power of Gargantus. Venus Claptrap was later brought out of the comics again by Vexor during the "Shadow Borg" saga.

Cyber-Serpent
 First Appearance: "The Doctor Is In" (10/18/96)
 Voice Actor: Ezra Weisz

A very powerful snake monster that came from a two-part comic. He has no head and has a snake where his head and arms should be. When Cyber-Serpent was first released from the comics, it was said that he was immune to the Beetleborgs weapons. This trait was never mentioned again after he was brought back a second and third time. Because his issue had not reached the stores yet, the kids had no idea on how to defeat Cyber-Serpent. With the help of Dr. Baron von Frankenbeans, the Beetleborgs came up with a strategy to trick the monster and send it back into the comic book....and it worked as they blasted him with their Sonic Lasers when he was unsuspectingly standing right above a copy of the comic book he came from and was promptly sent back. He reappeared in the "Curse of the Shadow Borg" saga, and was summoned by Nukus at the end of Season 1.

Dicehead
 First Appearance: "The Brain in the Attic" (10/25/96)
 Voice Actor: Steve Jones Watson

A monster whose brain was stolen by Typhus and placed into Hillhurst mansion. Drew mentions that Dicehead was from issue #125 of the comics. Whoever held the brain, their worst fears were brought to life (with Jo facing her Aunt May and her "slobbery kisses,"Wolfgang facing giant fleas, Nano facing a trio of ninjas, Count Fangula facing his "nightmare" of an ex-wife, Drew facing giant broccoli, and Mums facing a giant pair of scissors). When Dicehead came to life, he was clueless and idiotic (and speaking in surfer slang). Once reunited with his brain, Dicehead's intelligence was restored, making him extremely dangerous (and his real voice was deep and fiercer). To defeat him, the Beetleborgs had to confuse him, causing his brain to shatter, his intelligence to dissipate, and his defeat to come quick. He later reappeared in the "Curse of the Shadow Borg" saga and was later released by Nukus amongst the other monsters. Both of those times he was wiped out by Drew's Thunder Stinger (the latter in Mega-Blue mode).

Grenade Guy
 First Appearance: "Bye, Bye Frankie" (10/31/96)
 Voice Actor: Michael Sorich

A humanoid grenade monster that was assigned to kidnap Frankenbeans so the Magnavores could ransom him for the Beetle Bonders. Drew says he is from issue #101 from the comic book series. At the Halloween party held at Zoom Comics, Frankenbeans (who had left Hillhurst) tried to blend into the costumed crowd, and soon, Grenade Guy was there to kidnap him while the Beetleborgs were distracted. In the ensuing battle, Grenade Guy overpowered Roland, but then the Beetleborgs decided to try a new maneuver with their AVs. Jo equipped her AV with the Blue AV's magnet attachment to capture Grenade Guy, who was being held still by Roland's Hunter Claw. She then dropped him onto the other two AVs, which were waiting to finish him off. He reappeared during the "Curse of the Shadow Borg" saga.

Porkasaurus
 First Appearance: "Fangs Over Charterville" (11/2/96)
 Voice Actor: Bob Johnson

Porkasaurus is a pig monster. Like Mighty Morphin Power Rangers monster Pudgy Pig, Porkasaurus was brought out to consume all the food in Charterville during a blood drive. He was taken down and condemned back to the comics by Drew's Stinger Blade. He reappeared during the "Curse of the Shadow Borg" saga and was later released from the comics by Nukus amongst the other monsters in the Season Finale.

Detestro the Cave Warrior
 First Appearance: "Raiders of the Tomb" (11/15/96)
 Voice Actor: Rick Tane

A demonic humanoid white-haired warrior attired in a black outfit and armed with a spear. Detestro is mentioned by Drew to be from issue #131 of the comic book series. Drew and Josh broke into the cemetery to steal the Energy Axis from Vexor when he was powering up Shadowborg. Vexor then summoned Detestro the Cave Warrior to hunt the boys down and retrieve the device. When Drew used the Energy Axis to become his Mega-Blue form for the first time, Detestro was eventually swept back to the comic books by the Thunder Stinger.

Cataclaws
 First Appearance: "Yo Ho Borgs" (11/25/96)
 Voice Actor: Alex Borstein

A sloth monster who impersonated Blackbeard the Pirate. Drew says she was from issue #134 of the comic book series. Cataclaws was large with orange and white fur and green eyes. After exposing the true Blackbeard by having Flabber playing the rap music that Blackbeard raps to, Cataclaws shed her disguise and fled with the Beetleborgs in pursuit. She was sent back to the comics by the Beetleborgs' weapons.

Mucant
 First Appearance: "Pet Problems" (3/21/97)
 Voice Actor: Steve Kramer

An orange muscular bird-faced monster with dragon-like wings, bird-like feet, built-in shoulder cannons (one-shaped like a dragon head and the other shaped like a lobster claw), and a scorpion-like tail. It was summoned by the Magnavores to kidnap people's pets and ransom them. Mucant met his match when he tried to capture Wolfgang's strange pet, a feisty purple furred animal with a large mouth. Roland and Jo fired their weapons at Mucant to send him back to the comic books. He reappeared in the Season Finale when he was released by Nukus amongst other monsters.

Furocious
 First Appearance: "Operation Frankenbeans" (3/28/97)
 Voice Actor: Brad Orchard

A blue moth-headed monster with brown fur. Furocious could breathe fire in battle. Vexor's strategy to harm the kids was to constantly disrupt their daily lives so they would fail school. To add further complications, Furocious was called upon by Vexor from issue #136. Once the kids saw through Vexor's plan, he was sent back to the comics when Roland used/powered up his Green Hunter Claw. Even though the monster is called Furocious, he is never referred to by name and is named in the credits.

Skullhead
 First Appearance: "The Curse of Mums' Tomb" (4/3/97)
 Voice Actor: David Walsh

A skull-headed monster. He is mentioned by Roland as being from issue #137 of the Beetleborgs comic book series where Skullhead seemed impressed by Roland's knowledge of comic books. In battle, Skullhead could blast lasers from his eyes, teleport, and move/attack at great speeds (albeit upside down mostly). The kids confronted the Magnavores to retrieve Mums' lost, cursed, and magical scarab necklace. To deal with the Beetleborgs, Skullhead was called from the comics and he pulled the heroes into another dimension. Skullhead was referred to (by Jara) as her bodyguard He was quickly defeated in this new dimension, with the combined efforts of the Beetleborgs' weapons and the power of Mega Blue Beetleborg and his Thunder Stinger. When he was defeated, the Magnavores retreated and left behind the scarab necklace.

Malavex
 First Appearance: "This Old Ghost" (4/4/97)
 Voice Actor: Brian Tahash

A green monster with a bird-like face and a voice like Scatman Crothers. He almost resembles Mucant, minus the wings (and add in the fact that Malavex was green). Malavex's pastime was playing his trumpet, but his music was disturbing the grave of Old Man Hillhurst. For Hillhurst to rest in peace again, the Beetleborgs had to send Malavex back to the comic. Roland did just that with his Hunter Claw. Drew pointed out that Malavex was from issue #138 and was the most vicious Magnavore ever drawn. Malavex's head later appeared on Borgslayer.

Hammerhands
 First Appearance: "Jo's Strange Change" (4/10/97)
 Voice Actor: Bob Papenbrook

A one-eyed hammer-headed robot with hammer-shaped hands. He is mentioned as being from issue #139 of the comic book series. Hammerhands attacked the Beetleborgs at the time when Wolfgang accidentally used a spell on Jo which made her look different. When the Beetleborgs scanned him, in battle, they discovered his one eye was his weak spot. When Drew fired his Stinger Drill at this spot, Hammerhands was sent back to the comics.

Swamp Scumoid
 First Appearance: "Something Fishy" (4/17/97)
 Voice Actor: Dave Mallow

Swamp Scumoid was a dark green Gillman-resembling monster with the most horrid odor and was impersonating Charterville's urban legend called Charterville Charlie. The Beetleborgs were at first hesitant to kill it, thinking this creature was a real scientific discovery. Vexor had released him before the comic was made available to the public, though Jara, Noxic, and Typhus did not know it. However, the monster took Trip hostage by knocking him out with his odor, holding him until he managed to escape. He later took Mums hostage in the catacombs below Hillhurst. Roland quickly discovered the latest issue of the comics and learned that this monster was not the actual Charterville Charlie after all, but the Swamp Scumoid. After Mums was rescued, the smelly fish was zapped with the Sonic Lasers.

Crimson Creep
 First Appearance: "Bride of Frankenbeans" (4/18/97)
 Voice Actor: Patrick Thomas

A red moth monster summoned by the Magnavores to crash the wedding of Frankenbeans and Bride of Frankenbeans. Crimson Creep is said to be from issue #140 of the comic book series. He ended up getting his own party crashed into when Drew, in Mega Blue Beetleborg mode, sent him back to the comics with his trusty Thunder Stinger. He was later released from the comics by Nukus amongst other monsters in the Season Finale.

Unctuous
 First Appearance: "Fangula's Last Bite" (4/21/97)
 Voice Actor: Jimmy Theodore

A clawed red-and-orange crab/shrimp monster who was to help the Magnavores capture Fangula's boss Vlad. The plan did not work, though, as he fell victim to Roland's Hunter Claw and the Beetleborgs' Sonic Lasers. He was later released from the comics by Nukus in the Season Finale.

Super Grenade Guy
 First Appearance: "The Good, the Bad, and the Scary" (4/25/97)
 Voice Actor: Michael Sorich

A second version of Grenade Guy. Drew mentioned he was from issue #146 from the comics. He was by Noxic who claimed that he was much more powerful than last time. Super Grenade Guy could self-destruct and pull his dismembered body back together at any time. The Beetleborgs focused and blasted their weapons at him, for an extended period of time, causing his levels to rise to a dangerous amount. Once his meters were full, he exploded for a final time and was sent back to the comics. Super Grenade Guy was later released from the comics by Nukus in the Season Finale.

Kombat Gnat
 First Appearance: "Buggin' Out" (4/28/97)
 Voice Actor: Billy Forester

Kombat Gnat is a blue/lavender gnat monster with large teeth that could shrink in size. He is mentioned as being from issue #144 of the comic book series. Kombat Knat was sent to act as a spy at Hillhurst. However, Flabber was messing around with a teleportation machine while Kombat Gnat crept inside. The machine fused them together and Flabber slowly transformed into Combat Gnat (similar to Jeff Goldblum in The Fly). The Beetleborgs were faced with a difficult dilemma: let Charterville get destroyed by Kombat Gnat or fight Kombat Gnat (which meant having to fight Flabber) and risk losing Flabber forever. Kombat Gnat was destroyed and sent back by the Beetleborgs' weapons, but Flabber somehow survived much to the happy surprise of the kids and Hillhurst monsters. He later reappeared in the Season Finale (minus Flabber attached to him) when Nukus released him amongst other monsters where he was taken down for good by Drew's Thunder Stinger (in Mega Blue Beetleborg mode).

Hypnomaniac
 First Appearance: "Svengali, By Golly" (5/2/97)
 Voice Actor: Joey Lotsko

An insectoid sorcerer-like monster with hypnotic abilities. He is mentioned as being from issue #145 of the comic book series. Vexor was tired of the trio's failures. After they bungled their mission to capture Flabber, Vexor fired them. Hypnomaniac was summoned to hypnotize the Hillhurst monsters into becoming Vexor's new servants. Ultimately, Hypnomaniac fell victim to Drew's Thunder Stinger (in regular Blue Stinger mode). He was later released from the comics by Nukus amongst other monsters in the Season Finale where his head was later seen as the seemingly main head of Borgslayer.

Evil Eye
 First Appearance: "Big Bad Luck" (5/5/97)
 Voice Actor: Frank Tahoe

A green skeleton monster with a peach-colored head that has one green eye and has smaller skulls on its upper back. The Magnavores were hiding in the Hillhurst attic to cause bad luck for Flabber and the house monsters. They turned things up a notch by calling Evil Eye. Evil Eye's powers came from his eye and by attacking the eye, Evil Eye would be defeated. Evil Eye was defeated when the lasers he shot from his eye were reflected back onto him with a reflective old hubcap that the Beetleborgs used. He was later released from the comics by Nukus in the Season Finale.

Rocket Man
 First Appearance: "A Monster is Born" (5/9/97)
 Voice Actor: Oliver Page

Rocket Man was a blue robot that fired blinding flash bombs. He is mentioned as being from issue #148. The Magnavores left a baby at Hillhurst. Little did they know, the baby was really Rocket Man in disguise. However, Rocket Man briefly reverted to a baby-like persona when Flabber materialized an over-sized bottle to distract him. The Beetleborgs took the window of opportunity and defeated him with the Sonic Lasers.

Super Noxic
 First Appearance: "Brotherly Fright" (5/16/97)
 Voice Actor: Derek Stephen Prince

Noxic's younger brother that looks like Noxic, but very muscular. He is mentioned as being from issue #150 of the Beetleborgs comic book series. The Hillhurst monsters were getting in shape with Flabber's aerobic workout, but Noxic wanted to make the exercise brutal. He summoned his brother, who disguised himself as an S&M muscle-headed trainer named Hurt-Ulese. As Hurt-Ulese, he put the Hillhurst monsters through the most intense workout they had ever experienced. His true identity was found out by the kids, though, when Jo found his ID in his gym bag - the picture ID had the face of Super Noxic on it. Soon afterwards, he revealed himself to the kids and took them on in battle. He and Noxic briefly combined in battle, with Noxic controlling him from the inside. While Super Noxic proved to be a tough opponent for the Beetleborgs, he turned out to be no match for Drew's Thunder Stinger (in Mega Blue Beetleborg mode). Before being sent back to the comics, Super Noxic released Noxic from being pulled back in with him.

Borgslayer
 First Appearance: "Borgslayer!" (5/20/97)
 Voice Actors: Bob Papenbrook and Dave Mallow (simultaneous)

The final monster of Season One. After Nukus was brought to life, he brought out 14 Beetleborgs monsters (consisting of Graxxis, LottaMuggs, Garganturat, Amphead, Cyber-Serpent, Dicehead, Porkasaurus, Mucant, Crimson Creep, Unctuous, Super Grenade Guy, Kombat Knat, Hypnomaniac, and Evil Eye) from their comic issues to battle the Beetleborgs. During battle, a few monsters (namely Kombat Knat and Dicehead) were sent back again by Drew (who was in Mega Blue Beetleborg mode) before Nukus fused the energies of every one of Vexor's remaining monsters (who disappeared back to their comics in the process) with the energies of the Beetleborgs' blaster powers to create one massive creature called Borgslayer, a composite monster that resembled Hypnomaniac with many monster faces on his front torso and large arms (among which were the faces of Vexor's brief second form, Shadowborg, Evil Eye, Kombat Knat, Malavex, Wingar, and Goldex). Borgslayer was far too powerful as he destroyed Gargantis with little to no trouble while the Magnavore Jet Fighters destroyed the Beetle Battle Base and all 3 A.V.'s. The only way to defeat Borgslayer was for the Beetleborgs to triangulate their firepower. By doing so, Borgslayer was finished and the residual energy from the explosion managed to suck all the Magnavores and Vexor, back into the comic book world forever.

Beetleborgs Metallix
Here are the monsters that are brought out of Les Fortunes' drawings by Nukus. They are adapted from B-Fighter Kabuto:

Aqualungs
 First Appearance: "Ghoul Trouble" (9/11/97)
 Voice Actor: Bob Papenbrook

Aqualungs is a red-and-yellow prehistoric starfish monster who had the ability to liquify his body, making him a difficult attack target. He was sent to infiltrate Hillhurst through the pipes in the basement. After a one-on-one with Roland, he was defeated with the Metallix Grappler.

Hagfish of Gar
 First Appearance: "Totally Slammin' Sector Cycles" (9/12/97)

Les was inspired by the legend of the Hagfish of Gar, a Beelzebufo-like monster that could hypnotize the minds of children with its singing. After creating a real Hagfish of Gar, it was unleashed so Nukus could capture the Beetleborgs while under the Hagfish of Gar's trance. However, the signal was useless when the Beetleborgs were borged. In fact, it even blocked the signal to the Beetle Battle Station when they tried to summon the B.V.'s. So the Crustaceans proceeded to hypnotize all the other kids in Charterville by amplifying Hagfish of Gar's singing with a stolen truck and loud speakers. Another technique Hagfish of Gar could do was to spray opponents with a very sticky goo, as demonstrated after Nukus releases him and sprays Les, and later Drew and Jo on their new Sector Cycles (which they, along with Roland, were taking out for a test-drive; they were to be activated using their Data Bonders). Hagfish of Gar ended up defeated by the Beetleborgs' Data Lasers.

Changeling
 First Appearance: "Monster Impostor" (9/16/97)
 Voice Actor: Ethan Murray

A shapeshifting salamander monster that looks like it is composed of many salamanders. He could disguise himself as any house monster, even Flabber. When on a mission to infiltrate Hillhurst, Changeling captured Flabber in a jar and took over his identity. At one point, he even disguised himself as Drew. Roland defeated the Changeling with his Metallix Grappler. His picture was seen among the many of Les' drawings that were combined with toxic chemicals and Nukus' powers to create Repgillian.

Fernzilla
 First Appearance: "Horror Hotel" (9/17/97)
 Voice Actor: Juliana Bolden

Fernzilla is a fern monster that could control vines to entangle anything and shot out deadly pollen spores from the vines sprouting from her head. Flabber and the monsters converted their mansion into a hotel. Among the hotel guests was an old hag who was really Fernzilla in disguise. She ended up losing to the Beetleborgs when she was shot by their Data Lasers. Her picture was seen among the many of Les' drawings that were combined with toxic chemicals and Nukus' powers to create Repgillian.

Roo-thless
 First Appearance: "Les is More" (9/18/97)
 Voice Actor: Lance Wingnut

A boxing giant kangaroo monster with a voice like Mickey Mouse and Mike Tyson. He had boxing gloves and a sword and could fire energy blasts from his pouch.  was brought to life by Vilor much against Nukus' wishes (though Vilor did tell Nukus that Les brought him to life). Monsters that were not brought to life by Nukus himself were uncontrollable and if he was not sent back in 24 hours, all 2 dimensional beings, meaning the Crustaceans, would be forced back to the 2nd dimension. It took the unlikely teamwork of the Beetleborgs, Nukus, and Horribelle to send  back where he belonged.

Ultimate Conqueror
 First Appearance: "Sunset Boo-levard" (9/19/97)
 Voice Actor: Henry Douglas Grey

Basically, he claims to be what his name suggests, but there is not much to him. Ultimate Conqueror is a strong white-scaled horned chameleon monster with horns and large claws. He had the Beetleborgs beaten, but he quickly met his match at the mercy of a has-been actress who simply screamed in his face enough to knock him over. The Beetleborgs took the opportunity to then defeat the monster with their weapons.

Torch Mouth
 First Appearance: "Extra...Beetleborgs Revealed" (9/22/97)
 Voice Actor: Brad Orchard

A fire-breathing smilodon monster that looked like a combination of a smilodon and a skeletal mouse with a striped smilodon's second head on his forehead. He can breathe fire out of his striped smilodon head. Torch Mouth was used by the Crustaceans to capture a reporter. He succumbed to Drew's Data Laser which was in Freeze Ray mode. His picture was seen among the many of Les' drawings that were combined with toxic chemicals and Nukus' powers to create Repgillian.

Ultra Vulture
 First Appearance: "Who's That Ghoul?" (9/23/97)
 Voice Actor: Gene Holliday

A fiery wind-breathing armored Teratornis monster. His fiery wind breath set the forests near Hillhurst on fire. Les called him the "Ultimate Bird of Prey." Ultra Vulture fell prey to the Beetleborgs' power weapons instead. Nukus was not pleased that Ultra Vulture did not live up to his description. His picture was seen among the many of Les' drawings that were combined with toxic chemicals and Nukus' powers to create Repgillian.

Brain Sucker
 First Appearance: "Attack of the Brain Suckers" (9/24/97)
 Voice Actor: Brett Walkow

Les began his own line of comics called Brain Sucker. The main character is a gray scorpionfish monster who had the ability to drain the intellect from anyone (by merely doing what his name suggests - sucking their brains), even Nano and the Hillhurst monsters (minus Frankenbeans, who apparently had no brains for the monster to suck on). Brain Sucker was created, according to the story, by the Monster Mother herself, and was hatched from an egg she laid in her lair. In battle, Brain Sucker could blast sharp darts from its mouth. The Data Lasers did this hideous creature in once and for all. After this, Nano, the Hillhurst monsters, and all of the Brain Sucker's other victims regained their intelligence.

Monster Smasher
 First Appearance: "Don't Fear the Reaper" (9/29/97)

An orange deformed woolly mammoth monster. The Grim Reaper was in town and rumor had it that he was seeking a successor before retiring. Nukus got word of the news and had Les draw Monster Smasher. Nukus and Monster Smasher were on their way to Hillhurst to eliminate the competition so Nukus could become the next Grim Reaper. They never got far though as Roland and Jo (on their Sector Cycles) eliminated Monster Smasher with their Beetle Battlers, forcing an angry Nukus to retreat.

Triplesaurus Rex
 First Appearance: "The Old Gray Flabber" (10/3/97)
 Voice Actor: Ari Ross

A blue 3-headed Tyrannosaurus monster with two short arms and two long tail-shaped tentacles. Les had drawn a portrait of Flabber which caused him to get old (in a situation akin to a revered "Picture of Dorian Gray"). Les then drew Triplesaurus Rex to distract the Beetleborgs from Flabber's rapid aging. After Triplesaurus Rex was seemingly destroyed by the Beetleborgs, his 3 heads came back to attack them. They ended up getting taken out of the picture also. Triplesaurus Rex's picture was seen among the many of Les' drawings that were combined with toxic chemicals and Nukus' powers to create Repgillian.

Piranha Khan
 First Appearance: "Son of Frankenbeans" (10/10/97)
 Voice Actor: Robert Axelrod

A black coelacanth/piranha monster who attacked the Beetleborgs while they were in the midst of their dissent stemming from the contest to see who was the best Beetleborg. Only after they learned to work together again does this monster get defeated.

Emily the Seed of Evil
 First Appearance: "How Does Your Garden Grow?" (10/20/97)
 Voice Actor: Anne Britt Makebakken

Little Ghoul was taking up a hobby in seed planting, so Horribelle took advantage by sending her an evil seed created by Les. The seed grew into a cactus (which Little Ghoul decided to name Emily), and then into a full female cactus monster, armed with a cactus shaped sword, which sucked the life out of Flabber and the house monsters in the process. However Little Ghoul had grown so attached to the monster, that she did not want the Beetleborgs to destroy her. The Beetleborgs decided they needed a distraction for the monster and Jo decided plant food was the best one for the job. Hearing that Emily needed help, Nukus sent Vilor and the Dregs to battle. Drew and Roland took on them while Jo took on Emily. But, with a heavy heart, she used her finisher (the Metallix Baton) on the monster, and then the others joined her, using the Data Lasers, to send Emily back to paper form. After destroying Emily, Jo thought about what Little Ghoul would think of all this, so the kids and Flabber decided to give Little Ghoul a new hobby to cheer her up.

Fangula Bat Monster
 First Appearance: "The Curse of The Mummy's Mommy" (10/30/97)
 Voice Actor: Joe Hackett

During a scuffle between Les Fortunes and the Hillhurst monsters, Fangula was accidentally transformed into a giant vampire bat monster by Mums' family heirloom (a sacred ring passed down to him by his mother). Mums was later captured by Horribelle while the ring was stuck on his finger. His mother agreed to reverse the spell only if her son was returned to her safely. Once Mums was rescued from Nukus' clutches, the spell was reversed thus turning Fangula back to normal in the midst of his battle with the Beetleborgs.

El Scorpio
 First Appearance: "Halloween Haunted House of Horrors" (10/31/97)
 Voice Actor: L.B. Bartholomew

A yellow sea scorpion monster. He could split his body to attack multiple opponents. El Scorpio was sent to infiltrate a Halloween party at Hillhurst. The Beetleborgs lured him outside and to an abandoned warehouse. Once outside, the Beetleborgs sent him back to the 2-D world after a short battle.

Shellator
 First Appearance: "Booger Man" (11/3/97)
 Voice Actor: Dave Mallow

Shellator is a green/yellow trilobite monster who can grow to giant size during battle. Les was running out of monster ideas, so the Crustaceans captured a Bogeyman called Booger Man to give Les nightmares to serve as inspiration and Shellator was created (Shellator was the monster that appeared in Les's nightmare chasing after him). During Shellator's fight against the Beetleborgs, Shellator grew to a giant size Kaiju. The Beetleborgs managed to cut him down to normal size, then put the final blow on him with their Data Lasers.

Mole Monster
 First Appearance: "The Poe and the Pendulum" (11/6/97)
 Voice Actor: Michael McConnohie

A brown mole monster with red hair and sharp claws who was capable of digging underground. He was used to steal the book of Edgar Allan Poe's ghost, who was visiting Hillhurst at the time. The Beetleborgs' power weapons sent him spinning back to Les's drawing. He would be the final monster seen before the Lost Comic era.

Monster Mother: Root of all Evil
 First Appearance: "Experiment in Evil" (2/23/98)

Monster Mother was originally shown on a screen summoned by Nukus' power, with Les' narration, to demonstrate the birth and history of "Brain Sucker" comics. Outside of the Brain Sucker comics origin, this monster was created by Dr. Frankenbeans. The Hillhurst monsters were tired of being caught in the middle of the Beetleborgs' war, so they enlist the doctor's assistance. However, Dr. Frankenbeans and the creation were captured. When the Beetleborgs went to save him, they soon discovered that the Crustaceans fled in fear of the monster after she hatched from her egg. To kill Dr. Frankenbeans' monster, they had to sever the main root. They did so with their Mega Spectra armor and mega-weapons (Drew's Wrist-Rocket, Roland's Spectra-Lance, and Jo's Cross-Bow).

Repgillian
 First Appearance: "Mega Borg Power" (3/2/98)
 Voice Actor: Anne Britt Makebakken

The final monster the Beetleborgs faced. Repgillian was created from mixing toxic chemicals, Les' old drawings (consisting of Changeling, Fernzilla, Torch Mouth, Ultra Vulture, and Triplesaurus Rex), and Nukus' powers. When sent to Charterville, attacked the city in its giant size. This creature was more powerful than anything the Beetleborgs had ever faced and even Roboborg had trouble when he fought her. In a last-ditch effort, Roland stole the Astral Ax from the Crustaceans and called on Boron, which subsequently caused Boron to switch sides and join the Beetleborgs' side. It took the combination of the Mega Spectra Beetleborgs, Roboborg, and Boron to finally destroy Repgillian.

Notes

References

External links

 Big Bad Beetleborgs Page on Toku Central
 Beetleborgs Metallix Page on Toku Central
 
 

 
Fictional monsters